Funtime, Inc was an American amusement and entertainment company located in Cleveland, Ohio. The company was established in 1965. It owned several properties throughout its 31-year-long lifespan.

History

Funtime Inc. was established in 1965 when four former Cedar Point employees, including Gasper Lococo (1928–2016), a former military sergeant from Huron, pooled their resources and purchased Geauga Lake in Ohio for $5 million. The park had previously been owned by members of the Kuhlman/Schryer family. In 1983, the company began managing Wyandot Lake in Columbus, Ohio. That same year FunTime acquired 50% controlling interest in Darien Lake. In 1995, Funtime entered into an agreement to manage Lake Compounce in Bristol, Connecticut.

Sale to Premier Parks

In August 1995 Funtime, Inc. was acquired by Premier Parks (later Six Flags) for $60 million. The deal to manage Lake Compounce was canceled and the Kennywood Entertainment Company was awarded the contract.

Properties

References

Sources

External links

Companies based in Ohio
Entertainment companies established in 1968
Entertainment companies disestablished in 1996
Funtime, Inc.
Geauga Lake